The Pompilinae are a subfamily of the spider wasp family, Pompilidae, the species of which lay their eggs on the paralysed bodies of their prey.

The Pompilinae contain the following genera, not all of which may currently be valid:

Abripepsis Banks 1946
Aeluropetrus Arnold 1936
Aetheopompilus Arnold 1934
Agenioidevagetes Wolf 1978
Agenioideus Ashmead 1902
Alasagenia Banks 1944
Allaporus Banks 1933
Allochares Banks 1917
Alococurgus Haupt 1937
Amblyellus Wolf, 1965
Anoplagenia Bradley 1946
Anoplioides Haupt 1950
Anoplius Dufour, 1834
Apareia Haupt 1929
Apinaspis Banks 1938
Aplochares Banks 1944
Aporinellus Banks 1911
Aporus Spinola 1808
Arachnospila Kincaid 1900
Arachnotheutes Ashmead 1893
Argyroclitus Arnold 1937
Argyrogenia Bradley 1944
Aridestus Banks 1947
Arpactomorpha Arnold 1934
Aspidaporus Bradley 1944
Atelostegus Haupt 1929
Austrochares Banks 1947
Austrosalius Turner 1917
Baguenaia Giner Mari 1942
Bambesa Arnold, 1936
Batozonellus Arnold 1937
Batozonoides Haupt 1950
Calopompilus Ashmead 1900 
Ceropalites Cockerell 1906
Chalcochares Banks 1917
Chelaporus Bradley 1944
Ciliaporus Wahis 1970
Claveliocnemis Wolf 1968
Cliochares Banks 1941
Cordyloscelis Arnold 1935
Ctenostegus Haupt 1930
Cyemagenia Arnold 1934
Dasyclavelia Haupt 1929
Dendropompilus Williams 1947
Derochorses Banks 1941
Dicranoplius Haupt 1950 
Dicyrtomellus Gussakowski 1935
Dimorphagenia Evans 1973
Dolichocurgus Haupt 1937
Drepanaporus Bradley 1944
Dromochares Haupt 1930
Eidopompilus Kohl 1899Elaphrosyron Haupt 1929Entomobora Gistel 1857Eoferreola Arnold 1935Epiclinotus Haupt 1929Episyron Schiödte, 1837Euclavelia Arnold, 1935Euplaniceps Haupt 1930Euryzonotulus Arnold 1937Evagenia Banks 1946Evagetes Lepeletier 1845Ferreola Lepeletier 1845Ferreolomorpha Ashmead 1900Gilbertellana Pate 1946Gonaporus Ashmead 1902 Hadroclavella Haupt 1962Hauptiella Arnold 1936Herpetosphex Arnold, 1940Heterodontonyx Haupt 1935Homonotus Dahlbom 1843 Hormopogonius Arnold 1934 Icazus Priesner 1966Idiaporina Evans 1974Iridomimus Evans 1970Kyphopompilus Arnold 1960Lissagenia Banks 1946Melanoporus Ashmead 1902 Metaposcopus Haupt 1962 Micraporus Priesner 1955Microclavelia Haupt 1957 Microferreola Haupt 1935 Microphadnus Cameron 1904 Micropompilus Priesner 1955 Mimocurgus Haupt 1937 Minotocyphus Banks 1934 Morochares Banks 1934 Mystacagenia Evans 1973 Nannaporus Priesner 1966Nanoclavelia Priesner 1948Narochares Banks 1934Neanoplius Banks 1947Neoplaniceps Bradley 1944Nesopompilus Williams 1947Notoplaniceps Bradley 1944Pachycurgus Haupt 1937Pamirospila Wolf 1970Parabatozonus Yasumatsu 1936
Paracyphononyx Gribodo 1884
Paraferreola Sustera 1913
Paragenioideus Wolf 1968
Paranoplius Haupt 1929
Parapsilotelus Arnold 1960
Paraschistonyx Haupt 1962
Pareiaxenus Haupt 1962
Pareiocurgus Haupt 1930
Pedinpompilus Wolf 1961
Phanagenia Banks 1933
Phanochilus Banks 1944
Plagomma Haupt 1941
Platydialepis Haupt 1941
Podagenia Priesner 1973
Poecilocurgus Haupt 1937
Poecilopompilus Howard 1901
Pompilopterus Rasnitsyn 1975
Pompilus Fabricius 1798
Priochilus Banks 1944
Psammoderes Haupt 1929 
Pseudageniella Haupt 1959 
Pseudoclavelia Haupt 1930 
Pseudoferreola Radoszkowski 1888 
Pseudopompilus (Costa, 1887)
Pseudosalius Ashmead 1904 
Psoropempula Evans 1975 
Psorthaspis Banks 1912 
Pygmachus Haupt 1930 
Quiris Pate 1946 
Rhabdaporus Bradley 1944 
Rhynchopompilus Arnold 1934 
Schistonyx Saussure 1887 
Sericopompilus Howard 1901 
Spuridiophorus Arnold 1934 
Stolidia Priesner 1966 
Syntomoclitus Arnold 1937 
Tachyagetes Haupt 1930 
Tachypompilus Ashmead, 1902
Taeniaporus Haupt 1930 
Tagalochares Banks 1934 
Tastiotenia Evans 1950 
Telostegus Costa 1887 
Telostholus Haupt 1929 
Trachyglyptus Arnold 1934 
Tupiaporus Arle 1947 
Turneromyia Banks 1941
Xenanoplius Haupt 1950 
Xenaporus Ashmead 1902
Xenocurgus Haupt 1937

References

 
Apocrita subfamilies